Kenneth Furlonge (born 20 August 1937) is a Trinidadian former cricketer. He played eighteen first-class matches for Trinidad and Tobago between 1957/58 and 1968/69.

References

External links
 

1937 births
Living people
Trinidad and Tobago cricketers